The Department of Mechanical Engineering is responsible for teaching and research in mechanical engineering at Imperial College London, occupying the City & Guilds Building at the South Kensington campus. The department has around 45 faculty members, 600 undergraduates, and 250 postgraduate students. The department ranks 8th in the QS World University Rankings's 2018 table.

History
The origins of the department lie in the 1884 appointment of William Unwin as professor of civil and mechanical engineering at the Central Institution of the City & Guilds of London Institute, later the City & Guilds College, one of the predecessors to Imperial College. In 1904, the department was taken over by William Dalby. The department's main building was renamed the City & Guilds Building in 2013 as a reference to the historical association of the department of the college, and in 2018 a complete refurbishment of the building was completed.

Academics

Study

Undergraduate
The undergraduate program at the department is a 4-year integrated course leading to a master's degree in mechanical engineering, including an option to study a year abroad, or take an extra year in industry. All students graduating with the MEng degree also automatically receive an Associateship of the City and Guilds of London Institute.

Postgraduate
The department offers a 12-month taught postgraduate programme leading to a MSc, as well as taking on doctor's students studying for a PhD. All postgraduate students of the department are also eligible for the Diploma of Imperial College, DIC, alongside their standard degree when graduating.

Rankings
The college ranks 10th in the world for engineering on the Times Higher Education subject rankings, and the department in particular ranks 8th in the world in the 2018 QS world subject rankings. Domestically, the department ranks 2nd on the Complete University Guide's 2019 mechanical engineering table after Cambridge, and 1st on The Guardian's 2019 mechanical engineering university subject rankings.

Research

The department's research is conducted by research groups which have a particular academic focus. These research groups are organized by the department into different divisions which centre around fields of study:

 Applied mechanics
 Dynamics - Aeroelasticity and structural dynamics in turbomachinery
 Medical engineering - Human skeletal and muscular structure
 Non-destructive evaluation - Inspecting and investigation through non destructive processes
 Nuclear engineering - Nuclear thermal hydraulics and reactor physics
 Tribology - Lubrication and friction

 Thermofluids
 The Aimee Morgans lab, Professor Aimee Morgans - Thermo-acoustic instabilities and vehicular aerodynamic drag
 The Hazelab group, Professor Guillermo Rein - Heat and fire science
 Turbocharger testing and research group, Professor Ricardo Martinez-Botas - Exhaust gas energy recovery and turbocharging

 Mechanics of materials
 Metal-forming technologies group, Dr Liliang Wang - Metal-forming processes
 Materials Modelling, Dr Daniel Balint - Advanced modelling of materials
 Adhesion and Adhesives, Dr Bamber Blackman - Joining technologies and adhesive bonding
 Nanomaterials, Dr Ambrose Taylor - Material microstructure and nanoparticle-modified materials
 Soft Solids, Professor Maria Charalambides - Deformation and fracture of soft polymers and other soft materials
 Structural Applications
 Component Structural Integrity, Professor Kamran Nikbin - Examining the durability and performance of materials subjected to a range of conditions, and investigating this in relation to safety
 Electrochemical Science and Engineering, Dr Greg Offer - Applications of electrochemical devices to mobile and stationary power
 Novel Manufacture for Performance, Dr Paul Hooper

The department also runs academic centres, some in partnership with industry, including the Vibration University Technology Centre, the AVIC Centre for Structural Design and Manufacture, and the BIAM-Imperial Centre for Materials Characterisation, Processing and Modelling.

People
 William Dalby, former head of department
 William Unwin, former head of department

References

External links
Department of Mechanical Engineering website
Imperial College London website

1884 establishments in England
Educational institutions established in 1884
Mechanical Engineering
Mechanical engineering schools
Mechanical Engineering